SteppingStone Theatre for Youth Development is the largest performing theatre for youth in the greater Saint Paul area.  The mainstage season, which runs annually from October to July, features many plays written on commission by emerging local playwrights.  SteppingStone Theatre also offers years round youth acting classes, workshops and residencies throughout the Twin Cities and greater Minnesota.

History
SteppingStone Theatre for Youth Development was founded in 1987 with two artist-in-residence programs at inner-city Saint Paul schools that gave students a chance to have a participatory theatre experience. SteppingStone Theatre's focus has been on reaching out to children and youth who would not otherwise have the opportunity to participate in theatre and providing them with an expanding range of educational theatre experiences.

Today, this focus is pursued through the Performance and Creative Learning Programs. The theatre has served over 500,000 children, youth, schools and families through their mainstage shows each year, in-school residencies, theatre classes for youth, and Community Education classes.

Home until 2021
Construction on the former Grace Community Church, located at Victoria Street in Saint Paul next to William Mitchell College of Law, began February 2, 2007. SteppingStone Theatre officially moved into its new home on December 1, 2007, to open The Best Christmas Pageant Ever! that day.

The renovation included improvement of the exterior; conversion of the sanctuary into a 430-seat theatre with a proscenium-style stage equipped with modern lighting and sound capabilities; installation of an elevator for accessibility to all areas of the building; and construction of classrooms, dressing rooms and administrative offices on the lower level.

References
Royce, Graydon (November 18, 2007) "A place to shine" Star Tribune
Papatola, Dominic P. (November 6, 2008) "'Rainbow Crow' legend even more beautiful, and sad, because it's so rare" Saint Paul Pioneer Press
Berdan, Kathy (April 27, 2018) "https://www.twincities.com/2018/04/27/st-paul-steppingstone-theater-2018-season/" Saint Paul Pioneer Press

External links
SteppingStone Theatre for Youth Development

Youth theatre companies
Theatres in Minnesota
Youth organizations based in Minnesota
Arts organizations based in Saint Paul, Minnesota
Buildings and structures in Saint Paul, Minnesota
Education in Saint Paul, Minnesota
Minneapolis–Saint Paul
Arts organizations established in 1987
1987 establishments in Minnesota